Arash Abizadeh is an Iranian-Canadian philosopher and Professor at the Department of Political Science and Associate Member of the Department of Philosophy at McGill University. He is known for his expertise on democratic theory and Thomas Hobbes. 
He is a recipient of Rhodes Scholarship (1994).

Books
 Hobbes and the Two Faces of Ethics, Cambridge University Press, 2018,

See also
Ethnic group
Pistis
Civic nationalism
National myth
Nationalism
Johann Gottlieb Fichte
The Ethics of Immigration
Bahá'í administration
Branding national myths and symbols

References

External links
Arash Abizadeh at McGill University
Arash abizadeh personal website

Philosophy academics
Living people
Canadian philosophers
Political philosophers
Academic staff of McGill University
Canadian Rhodes Scholars
Alumni of the University of Oxford
21st-century Iranian philosophers
Canadian political scientists
Iranian political scientists
Hobbes scholars
Year of birth missing (living people)
University of Winnipeg alumni
Harvard Graduate School of Arts and Sciences alumni